The 2013 FIBA Europe Under-20 Championship for Women Division B was the ninth edition of the Division B of the Women's European basketball championship for national under-20 teams. It was held in Albena, Bulgaria, from 4 to 14 July 2013. Belgium women's national under-20 basketball team won the tournament.

Participating teams

  (16th place, 2012 FIBA Europe Under-20 Championship for Women Division A)

  (15th place, 2012 FIBA Europe Under-20 Championship for Women Division A)

  (14th place, 2012 FIBA Europe Under-20 Championship for Women Division A)

Final standings

Results

References

2013
2013–14 in European women's basketball
International youth basketball competitions hosted by Bulgaria
FIBA U20
July 2013 sports events in Europe